Guangdong music, also known as Cantonese music (廣東音樂 "Kwongdong yam ngok",Guǎngdōng yīnyuè) is a style of traditional Chinese instrumental music from Guangzhou and surrounding areas in Pearl River Delta of Guangdong Province on the southern coast of China. The name of the music is not an accurate description because Guangdong music is not the only music of the whole Guangdong area. Cantonese classical music especially were usually much livelier in pace and happier than those of other China provinces which is typical and the very essence of the Cantonese's character. In Guangdong, there are numerous traditional genres of music such as Teochew music and Hakka music (Hakka Hanyue and sixian). The name of the music originated in the 1920 and 1930s when the music was popular in Shanghai ballrooms in the form of "Spiritual Music" (精神音樂, Jīngshěn Yīnyuè; more properly translated as "spirited music"). As the performers were almost entirely from Guangdong, Shanghai people generalized the form of music as Guangdong music. Musically, compositions are based on tunes derived from Cantonese opera, together with new compositions from the 1920s onwards. Some pieces have influences from jazz and Western music, using syncopation and triple time, and incorporating instruments such as the saxophone, violin, guitar, piano, drum set, or xylophone.

Instrumentation
The gaohu is the most common lead instrument used in performing Cantonese music. It was invented by Lü Wencheng (吕文成, 1898-1981) in the 1920s. Prior to this, the erxian was the most common lead bowed string instrument in the Cantonese ensemble. Ensembles led by the erxian and also featuring the tiqin are called yinggong (硬弓, literally "hard bow") ensembles, while those led by the gaohu are called ruangong (软弓, literally "soft bow") because the erxian and tiqin have thick bamboo bows, while the gaohu has a thinner, flexible bow.

Guangdong music gradually evolved into a string ensemble format by the 1960s, led by the gaohu with ruan, qinqin, yangqin, sanxian, yehu, tiqin and various woodwind (including houguan) and percussion instruments. Alto saxophone, xylophone, violin, piano, electric guitar, and drum set may also be used, in combination with traditional instruments.

Composers
He Liutang (何柳堂, 1874-1933)
Lü Wencheng (吕文成, 1898－1981)
Qiu Hechou (丘鶴儔, 1880-1942)
Yan Laolie (嚴老烈, dates unknown)

Compositions
Baihua Ting Nao Jiu
Bu Bu Gao (步步高, by Lü Wencheng)
È Mǎ Yáo Líng (餓馬搖鈴, possibly by He Liutang)
Han Tian Lei (旱天雷, by Yan Laolie)
Jiao Shi Ming Qin (蕉石鳴琴, by Lü Wencheng)
Autumn Moon Over the Calm Lake (平湖秋月, by Lü Wencheng)
Qīng Méi Zhú Mǎ (青梅竹馬, by Lü Wencheng)
Sailong Duojin (賽龍奪錦, by He Liutang)
Xiao Tao Hong
Yu Da Ba Jiao (雨打芭蕉, possibly by He Liutang)
Yu Le Sheng Ping (娛樂昇平, by Qiu Hechou)

Audio samples

See also
Guangdong Chinese Orchestra

References

External links
Guangdong music page (Mandarin Chinese)

Chinese styles of music
Chinese folk music
Cantonese
Cantonese music